Felser is a surname. Notable people with the surname include:

Larry Felser (1933–2013), American sportswriter.
Claudia Felser (born 1962), German professor of physics and chemistry, specialist in materials science, co-recipient of the 2019 James C. McGroddy Prize for New Materials awarded by the American Physical Society (APS).
Catharina Felser (born 1982), German racing driver.
Peter Felser (born 1969), German politician

See also
Fesler

References